Hudi Vrh is a small village on a slight elevation south of Fara in the Municipality of Bloke in the Inner Carniola region of Slovenia.

Name
Hudi Vrh was attested in written sources as Posenperg in 1436 and Pösen perg in 1499.

Church
The local church in the settlement is dedicated to Saint Nicholas and belongs to the Parish of Bloke.

References

External links 

Hudi Vrh on Geopedia

Populated places in the Municipality of Bloke